HD 128093 is a double star in the constellation Boötes. The brighter component is an F-type main-sequence star with a stellar classification of F5V and an apparent magnitude of 6.33. It has a magnitude 11.33 companion at an angular separation of 28.1 along a position angle of 318°.

References

External links
 HR 5445
 CCDM J14342+3232
 Image HD 128093

Boötes
128093
071243
F-type main-sequence stars
Double stars
5445
Durchmusterung objects